The Centre for Policy Studies (CPS) is a think tank and pressure group in the United Kingdom. Its goal is to promote coherent and practical policies based on its founding principles of: free markets, "small state," low tax, national independence, self determination and responsibility. While being independent, the centre has historical links to the Conservative Party.

It was co-founded by Sir Keith Joseph, Alfred Sherman and Margaret Thatcher
in 1974 to challenge the post war consensus of Keynesianism, and to champion economic liberalism in Britain. With this in mind Keith Joseph originally wanted the think tank to study the social market economy, naming it the 'Ludwig Erhard Foundation' and 'Institute for a social market economy' until it was eventually settled on the benign 'Centre for Policy Studies'.

The centre has since played a global role in the dissemination of free market economics alongside policy proposals claimed to be on the basis of responsibility and individual choice. It also asserts that it prioritises the concepts of duty, family, liberty, and the rule of law. The CPS states that it has a goal of serving as "the champion of the small state."

Influence
The CPS soon drove for a reassessment of Conservative economic policy during their period in opposition from 1974 to 1979. It was during this period that the CPS released its landmark reports, such as Stranded on the Middle Ground? Reflections on Circumstances and Policies and   Monetarism is Not Enough (1974 and 1976). Monetarism is Not Enough was described by Margaret Thatcher as “one of the very few speeches which have fundamentally affected a political generation's way of thinking.". Keith Joseph's keynote speeches, also published by the CPS, aimed to lead the way in changing the climate of opinion in Britain and set the intellectual foundations for the privatisation reforms of the 1980s. In 1981 Sherman brought the Swiss monetarist Jurg Niehans over to Britain to advise on economic management. Niehans wrote a report critical of the government's economic management that was crucial in influencing the change of policy in the 1981 budget; this tightened the government's fiscal stance to make possible a looser monetary policy. However Hugh Thomas, who had been appointed Chairman of the CPS in 1979 was finding Sherman impossible to work with. In the summer of 1983, following a row over the relationship of the CPS with the Conservative Party, Sherman was summarily sacked from the CPS in a "virulent" letter from Thomas.

The CPS did not consciously represent itself as a partisan institute; ‘blame’ for the collectivist post-war consensus was placed on both sides of the political parties for operating within the same ideological framework. The CPS continually advocated a liberal economic approach and was hugely influential during Margaret Thatcher's administration, operating as a key driving force towards her hallmark policies of privatisation, deregulation and monetarism

In her own words, its job was to 'expose the follies and self-defeating consequences of government intervention....'to think the unthinkable'. In 1982, it released  Telecommunications in Britain, which urged the Government to embrace a fuller agenda of privatization in the telecoms sector. The paper recommended the privatization of British Telecom and the introduction of competition to the sector –both of which were implemented. Another key publication was The Performance of the Privatised Industries (1996) – a four volume statistical analysis which showed how the privatization agenda had benefitted the consumer by ushering in lower prices and higher quality service. It argued that the taxpayer had benefitted greatly from privatisation – not just from the initial windfall from receipts, but also from higher tax revenues than had ever been received from the same companies when they were in state ownership.

According to the 2014 Global Go To Think Tank Index Report (Think Tanks and Civil Societies Program, University of Pennsylvania), CPS is number 89 (of 150) in the "Top Think Tanks Worldwide (U.S. and non-U.S.)" and number 69 (of 80) in the "Top Think Tanks in Western Europe".

Funding 
Think tank Transparify, which is funded by the Open Society Foundations, ranked the CPS as one of the four least transparent think tanks in the UK in relation to funding. Transparify's report How Transparent are Think Tanks about Who Funds Them 2016? rated them as 'highly opaque,' one of 'a handful of think tanks that refuse to reveal even the identities of their donors.

In November 2022, the funding transparency website Who Funds You? gave the CPS an E grade, the lowest transparency rating (rating goes from A to E).

History
In 2009, the CPS celebrated its 35th anniversary for which the Leader of the Opposition, David Cameron MP, gave a speech highlighting the role the CPS played in the Conservative Party's victory in the 1979 election crediting them with ‘a great rebirth of intellectual ideas, of intellectual vigour, and of intellectual leadership’

Reports
In September 2011 the CPS published Guilty Men by Peter Oborne and Frances Weaver. The report sought to identify the politicians, institutions and commentators who the authors felt had tried to take Britain into the European single currency and claims to expose attacks carried out by the Euro supporters. Oborne particularly identifies William Hague, Iain Duncan Smith and Lord Owen as three voices of opposition to early Euro entry that suffered personal attacks from these sources.

In October 2011, Andrew Tyrie MP's After the Age of Abundance influenced the Chancellor's conference speech and subsequent Treasury policy.

Dominic Raab MP's November 2011 paper Escaping the Strait Jacket called for the number one economic and social priority for the Coalition beyond deficit reduction to be to encourage job creation. He called for 10 employment regulation reforms, including excluding small businesses from a range of regulations and creating a new 'no fault dismissal', recommendations that have found much support in the Conservative Party.

'How to Cut Corporation Tax' by David Martin and Taxing Mansions: the taxation of high value property by Lucian Cook were published prior to the Budget 2012 and respectively made arguments for a lower rate of corporation tax and against the proposed 'mansion tax'.

George Trefgarne's 'Metroboom: lessons from Britain's recovery in the 1930s' sought to revise the perception of the decade as universally destitute, a view attributed to Shadow Chancellor Ed Balls. Trefgarne presented a BBC Daily Politics Soapbox piece on the recovery experienced under the National Government of the time.

In May 2012, Ryan Bourne and Thomas Oechsle published Small is a Best, a report claiming that economies with small governments tend to grow faster than those with big governments.

In June 2012, the CPS published Tim Morgan's The Quest for Change and Renewal. Morgan says the paper in on how to "... rescue capitalism and re-empower the individual to a build a winning centre-right ideology ...".

Projects
CapX was founded by the CPS on 21 June 2014 in collaboration with Signal Media.

Policies
Economy – The CPS ‘believes in regulation that does not inhibit the growth of business, taxes that do not act as a disincentive to work or to investment in the UK, and a leaner more effective state that avoids unnecessary intervention in the economy’.

Family – The CPS advocates that fiscal policy should be reformed to support marriage through the tax system and to remove the welfare penalty on two-parent families. State intervention in family life should focus on protection of vulnerable children; it should not extend to managing their day-to-day lives and removing responsibility and judgment from parents.

Energy – Recent CPS publications have argued that the UK must develop its nuclear, clean coal (including coal gasification) and efficient renewable supplies of energy.

Public Services – The CPS has been a consistent advocate for greater choice and diversity of provision, opening up state monopolies to new providers and putting greater power and responsibility in the hands of parents and patients.

Drugs – The CPS’ Prison and Addiction forum (PANDA) was set up in 2008. It provides an independent forum of debate about drugs policy for academics, practitioners, psychiatrists, and specialist commentators. Its aim is to identify the reforms required in the UK to get our drug problem under control, to prevent drug use and to offer substance abusers the help and necessary care to combat their abuse.

Broadcasting – The CPS believes that public intervention should be focussed on where there is genuine 'market failure' and the remit and funding of the BBC should reflect this.

People
 Chairman: Michael Spencer 
 Director: Robert Colvile
 Deputy Chairman: Graham Brady MP
 Head of Policy: Alex Morton
 Head of Communications: Robyn Staveley
Head of Tax: Tom Clougherty
 Head of Business Policy: Nick King
 Head of External Relations: Callum Price

Notable Research Fellows
 Janet Daley (Columnist)
 Cristina Odone (Columnist)
 Kieron O'Hara
 Yorick Wilks

Notable Advisory Council members

 The Lord Griffiths
 The Lord Powell of Bayswater
 David Ruffley MP
 David Willetts MP
 Michael Fallon MP
 The Lord Norton of Louth
 Oliver Letwin MP
 Howard Flight
 John Redwood MP
 Andrew Roberts
 Andrew Tyrie MP
 Tim Montgomerie

See also
 List of UK think tanks

References

External links
 Centre for Policy Studies official site
 Centre for Policy Studies papers at London School of Economics (LSE) Archives

1974 establishments in the United Kingdom
Organisations associated with the Conservative Party (UK)
Organizations established in 1974
Political and economic think tanks based in the United Kingdom
Think tanks based in the United Kingdom